São Valério do Sul is a municipality in the state of Rio Grande do Sul, Brazil.  As of 2020, the estimated population was 2,729.

See also
List of municipalities in Rio Grande do Sul

References

External links
Official site

Municipalities in Rio Grande do Sul